The following is a timeline of the history of the city of Trapani, Sicily, Italy.

Prior to 20th century

 249 BCE - Naval Battle of Drepana fought; Carthaginian forces win
 241 BCE - Romans in power

 395 CE - Drepanum becomes part of the Eastern Roman Empire.
 827 CE - Muslim conquest of Sicily; town called "Tarabanis"
 1097 - Town taken by forces of Norman Roger I of Sicily
 1266 - Battle of Trapani
 1282 - Aragonese in power
 1284 - Naval siege of Trapani during the War of the Sicilian Vespers
 1332 - Madonna dell' Annunziata church built near town
 1421 - Trapani Cathedral construction begins.
 1432 - Trapani besieged by forces of Louis III of Anjou
 1570 - Population: 16,286
 1726 - Earthquake(it)
 1748 - Population: 17,311
 1760 - Madonna of Trapani church rebuilt.
 1798 - Population: 24,330
 1820 - Uprising against 
 1830 -  (library) opens.
 1844 - Roman Catholic Diocese of Trapani established
 1848 - Sicilian revolution of 1848
 1849 - Teatro Garibaldi (theatre) built
 1861 -  (administrative region) established
 1880 -  (railway station) opens.
 1897 - Population: 49,992

20th century
 1905 - Trapani Calcio football team formed.
 1906 - Population: 47,578.
 1911 - Population: 59,593
 1915 -  begins operating.
 1937 -  railway begins operating.
 1952 -  begins operating.
 1960 - Stadio Polisportivo Provinciale (stadium) opens in nearby Erice.
 1961 - Trapani–Birgi Airport opens.
 1968 - January: 1968 Belice earthquake

21st century
 2001 -  held;  becomes mayor.
 2012 - Local election held; Vito Damiano becomes mayor.
 2013 - Population: 68,967

See also
 Trapani history
 
 
 History of Sicily
 Timelines of other cities in the macroregion of Insular Italy:(it)
 Sardinia: Timeline of Cagliari 
 Sicily: Timeline of Catania, Messina, Palermo, Syracuse

References

This article incorporates information from the Italian Wikipedia.

Bibliography

in English

in Italian

External links

 Archivio di Stato di Trapani (state archives)
 Items related to Trapani, various dates (via Europeana)
 Items related to Trapani, various dates (via Digital Public Library of America)

Trapani
Trapani
trapani